Bizarre Foods with Andrew Zimmern is a travel and cuisine television show hosted by Andrew Zimmern on the Travel Channel in the US. The first season began on Monday, February 6, 2007, at 9pm ET/PT.

Bizarre Foods focuses on regional cuisine from around the world which is typically perceived as being disgusting, exotic or bizarre. In each episode, Zimmern focuses on the cuisine of a particular country or region. He typically shows how the food is procured, where it is served and, usually without hesitation, eats it.

Originally a one-hour documentary titled Bizarre Foods of Asia, repeated showings on the Travel Channel drew consistent, considerable audiences. In late 2006, TLC decided to turn the documentary into a weekly, one-hour show with the same premise and with Zimmern as the host. In 2009, Zimmern took a break from Bizarre Foods to work on one season of the spin-off Bizarre World.

Episodes

Season 1

Season 2

Season 3

Season 4

Season 5

Season 6

Seasons 7-12 - Bizarre Foods America

Beginning with Season 7, the show has been retitled Bizarre Foods America. The format remains the same but focuses more on the United States rather than international travel.

Starting with season 12, Bizarre Foods America has episodes in the other countries of the Americas. New episodes have been shot in Cartagena, Colombia; Lima, Peru; Ft. Worth, Texas; Copper River (Alaska); Nashville, Tennessee; Atlanta, Georgia; the Florida Keys; and Vancouver, British Columbia, Canada.

Season 13

Season 14 - Delicious Destinations (Season 1)
A spin-off series of half-hour episodes that focused on famed destinations' classic foods—where they came from, how they're prepared, and the best way to enjoy them. Focused on general fare and not bizarre foods.

Season 15

Season 16 - Delicious Destinations (Season 2)

Season 17

Season 18 - Delicious Destinations (Season 3)

Season 19 - Delicious Destinations (Season 4)

Season 20

Season 21 - Delicious Destinations (Season 5)

Season 22

Season 23 - Delicious Destinations (Season 6)

Season 24 - Delicious Destinations (Season 7)

Season 25

Season 26

Season 27 - Delicious Destinations (Season 8)

Season 28 - Delicious Destinations (Season 9)

Season 29 - Delicious Destinations (Season 10)

Season 30 - Delicious Destinations (Season 11)

Media
A DVD set (2 discs) called Bizarre Foods with Andrew Zimmern: Collection 1 was released on January 8, 2008.
It includes the following episodes:
Morocco
Spain
Philippines
Ecuador
New York City
United Kingdom
America's Gulf Coast
Mexico

A second DVD set (2 discs) called Bizarre Foods with Andrew Zimmern: Collection 2 was released on October 7, 2008.
It includes the following episodes:
Best Bites
Iceland
St.Petersburg
Minnesota
Guangzhou, China
Beijing, China
Bolivia
Chile
Delhi, India

References

External links
 
 "If it looks good, eat it!": interview with Andrew Zimmern
 Bizarre Foods interview and Season 3 schedule
 

2006 American television series debuts
2018 American television series endings
English-language television shows
Food travelogue television series
Travel Channel original programming
Adventure travel